Juradó is the most northwestern municipality and town in Chocó Department, Colombia. It borders on Panama and on the Pacific Ocean.

Climate
Juradó has a tropical monsoon climate (Am in the Köppen climate classification) with moderate rainfall from January to March and heavy to very heavy rainfall in the remaining months. The following climate data is for the town of Juradó.

References

Municipalities of Chocó Department
Colombia–Panama border crossings